The King's Thief is a 1955 swashbuckling CinemaScope adventure film directed by Robert Z. Leonard, who replaced Hugo Fregonese during filming. Released on August 5, 1955, the film takes place in London at the time of Charles II and stars Ann Blyth, Edmund Purdom, David Niven, George Sanders and Roger Moore.

Plot
James (Niven), the Duke of Brampton and the richest man in England, is so trusted by King Charles II (Sanders), he is able to have two of the King's loyal friends executed for treason. The second is the father of Lady Mary (Blyth).  She travels from France to London to seek justice.  While there, she meets Michael Dermott (Purdom), a soldier who fought to restore Charles to the throne.

He and many others were never paid for their services, unbeknownst to the King. He therefore turned highwayman. He and his comrades rob the Duke and come into possession of the Duke's notebook. In it are listed twelve rich and powerful people, as well as details of their possessions. Two names are crossed out; it does not take long for Michael to realize that the other ten are in peril for their lives. Michael first tries to blackmail the Duke, but without much success. A fence named Simon betrays his hiding place. Michael and his comrade Jack (Moore) escape from the Duke's soldiers, though Michael is wounded in the shoulder. Adventure abounds as the Duke tries to retrieve his property before it can be used against him.

Cast

Ann Blyth as Lady Mary
Edmund Purdom as Michael Dermott
David Niven as James - Duke of Brampton
George Sanders as Charles II
Roger Moore as Jack
John Dehner as Captain Herrick
Sean McClory as Sheldon
Tudor Owen as Simon
Melville Cooper ...  Henry Wynch
Alan Mowbray ...  Sir Gilbert Talbot
Rhys Williams ...  Turnkey
Joan Elan ...  Charity Fell
Charles Davis ...  Apothecary
Ashley Cowan ...  Skene
Ian Wolfe ...  Fell
Paul Cavanagh ...  Sir Edward Scott
Lillian Kemble-Cooper ...  Mrs. Fell
Isobel Elsom ...  Mrs. Bennett
Milton Parsons ...  Adam Urich
Jacob Hall ...  Lord Layton
Queenie Leonard ...  Apothecary's Wife
Owen McGiveney ...  Hoskins
Robert Dix ...  Husky
Michael Dugan ...  Husky
James Logan ...  Guard
Jimmy Aubrey ...  Little Man (uncredited)
Leonard Carey ...  Servant (uncredited)
Leslie Denison ...  Beadle (voice) (uncredited)
Ronald Green ...  Hired Swordsman (uncredited)
Peter Hansen ...  Isaac Newton (uncredited)
Ramsay Hill ...  Lord (uncredited)
Charles Keane ...  Guard (uncredited)
Keith McConnell ...  Usher (uncredited)
John Monaghan ...  Shaddy (uncredited)
Matt Moore ...  Gentleman (uncredited)
Clive Morgan ...  Captain of Guards (uncredited)
Vesey O'Davoren ...  Courier (uncredited)
Gordon Richards ...  Courier (uncredited)
Lewis L. Russell ...  Gentleman (uncredited)
Gilchrist Stuart ...  Clerk (uncredited)
Trevor Ward ...  Perspiring Man (uncredited)
Trude Wyler ...  Celestine (uncredited)

Production notes
MGM had a big hit at the box office with Ivanhoe (1952), a swashbuckling adventure film, leading to them making a cycle of such films. In October 1952 they announced they would make The King's Thief based on an original story by Robert Hardy Andrews about an Irish patriot during the reign of Charles II (likely based on Thomas Blood). Edwin Knopf was to produce and Knopf's son Christopher wrote the script. It was originally envisioned as a vehicle for Stewart Granger, who had recently made a swashbuckler for the studio, The Prisoner of Zenda 1952).

MGM then announced Robert Taylor would play the lead. Then by April 1953 Granger was back as star. Eventually the lead was given to Edmund Purdom who MGM were building into a star at the time.

In February 1954 MGM announced the film would be part of its schedule for the following year and would be directed by Gottfried Reinhardt.

The female lead went to Ann Blyth. Michael Wilding was going to play the villain before being replaced by David Niven in early December. It was a rare villain part for Niven.

Filming started 15 December 1954 under the direction of Hugo Fregonese. By early January, Fregonese had been replaced by MGM veteran Robert Z. Leonard who had been in semi-retirement since completing Her Twelve Men (1954) about twelve months previously. The Los Angeles Times reported that Fregonese and Edward Knopf "did not see eye to eye during production."

The cast included wrestler Lord Layton who played guard Jacob Hall who fought Edmund Purdom.

Reception

Box Office
According to MGM records the film earned only $478,000 in the US and Canada and $1,071,000 elsewhere, resulting in a loss to the studio of $707,000.

Critical
The Los Angeles Times called it "glittering and excellently made."

See also
List of American films of 1955

References

External links
 
 
 

1955 films
1950s historical adventure films
American historical adventure films
Films set in London
Films set in the 1670s
Metro-Goldwyn-Mayer films
CinemaScope films
American swashbuckler films
Films scored by Miklós Rózsa
Films directed by Robert Z. Leonard
Films directed by Hugo Fregonese
Cultural depictions of Charles II of England
Films about highwaymen
1950s English-language films
1950s American films